Norway Township is one of twelve townships in Humboldt County, Iowa, USA. As of the 2000 census, its population was 410.

History
Norway Township was organized in 1870. It was originally built up chiefly by Scandinavians.

Geography

Cities, towns, villages
Thor

Adjacent townships
 Lake Township (north)
 Liberty Township, Wright County (northeast)
 Eagle Grove Township, Wright County (east)
 Troy Township, Wright County (southeast)
 Newark Township, Webster County (south)
 Badger Township, Webster County (southwest)
 Beaver Township (west)
 Grove Township (northwest)

Cemeteries
The township contains East/West Ullensvang, Norway Lake, Norway Township, and Willicksen Cemetery.

Political districts
 Iowa's 4th congressional district
 State House District 4

References
 United States Census Bureau 2008 TIGER/Line Shapefiles
 United States Board on Geographic Names (GNIS)
 United States National Atlas

External links
 US-Counties.com
 City-Data.com

Townships in Humboldt County, Iowa
Norwegian-American culture in Iowa
Populated places established in 1875
Townships in Iowa